Season 1887–88 was the 12th season in which Hibernian competed at a Scottish national level, entering the Scottish Cup for the 11th time.

Overview 

Hibs reached the third round of the Scottish Cup, losing 6–2 to the Heart of Midlothian.

Results 

All results are written with Hibs' score first.

Scottish Cup

See also
List of Hibernian F.C. seasons

Notes

External links 
 Results For Season 1887/1888 in All Competitions, www.ihibs.co.uk

Hibernian F.C. seasons
Hibernian